Jesús Oyarbide (2 February 1902 – 23 March 1933) was a Spanish long-distance runner. He competed in the men's 5000 metres at the 1928 Summer Olympics.

References

1902 births
1933 deaths
Athletes (track and field) at the 1928 Summer Olympics
Spanish male long-distance runners
Olympic athletes of Spain
Place of birth missing
People from Enkarterri
Sportspeople from Biscay
Athletes from the Basque Country (autonomous community)